Oresteia (Орестея in Cyrillic) is an opera in three parts, eight tableaux, with music by Sergei Taneyev, composed during 1887–1894. The composer titled this work, his only opera, a "musical trilogy". The Russian libretto was adapted by A. A. Wenkstern from The Oresteia of Aeschylus. Nikolai Rimsky-Korsakov wrote that soon after the premiere, the Mariinsky management made cuts to the opera, which angered Taneyev.

The best-known excerpt from Oresteia is the entr'acte played before the second tableau of Part III, "The Temple of Apollo at Delphi". This passage, as well as other themes from the opera, figured into one of Taneyev's other works, namely, his orchestral overture entitled Oresteia (1889). This overture—not included in the printed score of this opera—constitutes a separate 18-minute-long symphonic poem based on themes from the trilogy.

Passages in the overture echo the UK's and other nations' national anthem, "God Save the Queen", whose melody lies in antiquity.

Harlow Robinson has noted that the opera avoids dramatic treatment of the murders of Agamemnon, Cassandra, Clytemnestra and Aegisthus, depicting those events off-stage.

Roles

Synopsis
Argos, before the Atrides palace.

Part 1: Agamemnon

Part 2: The Libation Bearers
Tableau 1: The interior of the Atrides palace

Tableau 2: An olive grove

Tableau 3: Setting as in Part 1

Part 3: The Eumenides
Tableau 1: A deserted place on the seashore

Tableau 2: Interior of Apollo's temple at Delphi

Tableau 3: Athens

Selected recordings
 Deutsche Grammophon 2709 097 (original LP issue): Victor Chernobayev, Lydia Galushkina, Anatoly Bokov, Nelli Tkachenko, Tamara Shimko, Ivan Dubrovin, Arkady Savchenko, Ludmilla Ganestova, Stanislav Frolov, Mikhail Pushkariev; Chorus and Orchestra of the Belorussian State Opera and Ballet; Tatyana Kolomizheva, conductor

This performance was later released on two CDs on the Melodiya label, but is sadly long out of print. (Reference: Amazon/classical music/Taneyev:Oresteia)

This performance appears to be now back in print on the Melodiya label. Some confusion, however, as the earlier Melodiya release says it was recorded in 1978, while the current one claims 1965. But same orchestra and conductor, and the current release is available at Amazon.

Performance History 
1895 Mariinsky Theatre
2011 Samara
2013 Bard SummerScape - Directed by Thaddeus Strassberger and conducted by Leon Botstein.
2015 Rostov-on-Don

References

Bibliography

 100 опер: история создания, сюжет, музыка. [100 Operas: History of Creation, Subject, Music.] Ленинград: Издательство "Музыка," 1968, pp. 426–432.
 Anastasia Belina. ‘Representation of Clytemnestra and Cassandra in Taneyev's 
 Oresteia.’Studies in Musical Theatre 2:1, 2008, pp. 61–81.

External links
Piano-vocal score in PDF format at the International Music Score Library Project.
The Russian libretto in HTML
The Russian libretto in a .zip file for Word
Review (in English) of a concert performance of Taneyev's 'Oresteia' in St. Petersburg, 2006

Operas
Russian-language operas
Operas by Sergei Taneyev
1895 operas
Operas based on classical mythology
Operas based on Agamemnon (Aeschylus play)
Agamemnon
Works based on The Libation Bearers
Works based on The Eumenides